In mathematics, Fontaine's period rings are a collection of commutative rings first defined by Jean-Marc Fontaine that are used to classify p-adic Galois representations.

The ring BdR
The ring  is defined as follows. Let

 such that .

References

Secondary sources

Algebraic number theory
Galois theory
Representation theory of groups
Hodge theory